Matt Donovan (born Ohio) is an American poet and nonfiction writer. A native of Hudson, Ohio, Donovan graduated from Vassar College with a BA, from Lancaster University with an MA, and from New York University with an MFA. He teaches at Santa Fe University of Art and Design.

Life and career
He is the author of two collections of poetry – Vellum (Mariner, 2007) and the chapbook Ten Burnt Lakes (Tupelo Press, forthcoming 2017) – as well as the collection of essays, A Cloud of Unusual Size and Shape: Meditations on Ruin and Redemption (Trinity University Press, 2016). His work appeared in AGNI, Blackbird, Poetry, The Kenyon Review, The Gettysburg Review, The Threepenny Review, and The Virginia Quarterly Review, among others literary journals.He is the recipient of a Rome Prize in Literature, a Whiting Award a Pushcart Prize, a National Endowment for the Arts Fellowship in Literature, a Lannan Writing Residency Fellowship, the Larry Levis Reading Prize from Virginia Commonwealth University and a Creative Capital award.

He is currently collaborating on the chamber opera Inheritance with his wife, artist Ligia Bouton, as well as the soprano Susan Narucki, and composer Lei Liang.

Works

BooksA Cloud of Unusual Size and Shape: Meditations on Ruin and Redemption. Trinity University Press. 2016.Ten Burnt Lakes.'' Tupelo Press. Forthcoming 2017.

Essays

References

External links
www.mattdonovanwriting.com).
Profile at The Whiting Foundation

http://coldfrontmag.com/tag/matt-donovan

American male poets
Vassar College alumni
Alumni of Lancaster University
New York University alumni
Living people
People from Hudson, Ohio
Poets from Ohio
College of Santa Fe faculty
Year of birth missing (living people)
21st-century American poets
21st-century American male writers